Mihails is a Latvian masculine given name. It is a cognate of the name Michael and may refer to:
Mihails Arhipovs (born 1974), Latvian bobsledder and Olympic competitor
Mihails Miholaps (born 1974), Latvian football striker 
Mihails Smorodins (born 1952), Latvian football striker
Mihails Tāls (1936–1992), Latvian chess Grandmaster 
Mihails Vasiļonoks  (born 1948), Latvian ice hockey goalie
Mihails Zemļinskis (born 1969), Latvian football player
Mihails Ziziļevs (born 1973), Latvian football midfielder 

Masculine given names
Latvian masculine given names